Spring Creek Presbyterian Church is a historic Presbyterian church in Doaks Crossroads, Tennessee.

The building features Greek Revival, Colonial Revival architecture and was added to the National Register of Historic Places in 2000.

References

Presbyterian churches in Tennessee
Churches on the National Register of Historic Places in Tennessee
Greek Revival church buildings in Tennessee
Colonial Revival architecture in Tennessee
Buildings and structures in Wilson County, Tennessee
National Register of Historic Places in Wilson County, Tennessee